Green screen compositing, or more generally chroma key compositing, is a technique for combining two still images or video frames.

Green screen may also refer to:

 Green-screen display, a monochrome CRT computer display
 GreenScreen Interactive Software, a publisher of video games
 Green screen of death, a failure mode on the TiVo digital video recorder and Xbox 360 console game system platforms
 Green Screen film festival, a film festival in Germany
 GreenScreen for Safer Chemicals a green chemicals assessment tool. 
 Drew Carey's Green Screen Show, an American improvisational show using a green screen

See also

 Screen on the Green (disambiguation)